"Lucky Lindy!" is a fox-trot song composed by Abel Baer, with lyrics by L. Wolfe Gilbert. It was published by Harmony in 1927.
The song was the first to celebrate Charles Lindbergh's transatlantic flight in the Spirit of St. Louis and his landing in Paris.

The sheet music can be found at the Pritzker Military Museum & Library.

Lyrics 
The piece was "Dedicated to the mother of 'Lucky Lindy'" and the sheet music describes it as a "Fox-Trot Song." Glibert's lyrics, as printed in the sheet music, are as follows:

References 

Bibliography
Holloway, Diane, and Bob Cheney. American History in Song: Lyrics from 1900 to 1945. San Jose: Authors Choice Press, 2001.  
Jasen, David A. Tin Pan Alley: The Composers, the Songs, the Performers, and Their Times : the Golden Age of American Popular Music from 1886 to 1956. New York: D.I. Fine, 1988. . 
Tyler, Don. Hit Songs, 1900-1955: American Popular Music of the Pre-Rock Era. Jefferson, N.C: McFarland, 2007.  

1927 songs
1927 singles
Cultural depictions of Charles Lindbergh
Songs written by L. Wolfe Gilbert
Songs written by Abel Baer
Songs about aviators
Songs about explorers